The 1994 Toronto Blue Jays season was the franchise's 18th season of Major League Baseball. It resulted in the Blue Jays finishing third in the American League East with a record of 55 wins and 60 losses. Cito Gaston was the manager for the American League squad at the All-Star Game. The Mid-Summer classic was played on July 12 at Three Rivers Stadium in Pittsburgh. Roberto Alomar and Joe Carter were starters at the event, while Pat Hentgen and Paul Molitor were named as reserves.

The season was cut short by the infamous 1994 player's strike, technically leaving the Blue Jays as the reigning World Champions.

Offseason
November 5, 1993: Jack Morris was released by the Toronto Blue Jays.
November 8, 1993: Danny Cox was signed as a free agent with the Toronto Blue Jays.
November 15, 1993: Randy St. Claire was signed as a free agent with the Toronto Blue Jays.
December 21, 1993: Greg Cadaret was signed as a free agent with the Toronto Blue Jays.
March 29, 1994: Mike Huff was traded by the Chicago White Sox to the Toronto Blue Jays for Domingo Martínez.

Regular season

The Blue Jays scored 566 runs (4.92 per game) and allowed 579 runs (5.04 per game) through 115 games by Friday, August, 12. After slumping to a 33-46 record on Sunday, July 3, Toronto went 22-14 before the players' strike ended the season prematurely.

July 14, 1994: Joe Carter wore a jersey with the "n" and second "t" in "Toronto" reversed for six innings during a game against the Texas Rangers.

Opening Day Starters
 Devon White, CF
 Roberto Alomar, 2B
 Paul Molitor, DH
 Joe Carter, RF
 John Olerud, 1B
 Carlos Delgado, LF
 Ed Sprague, 3B
 Pat Borders, C
 Alex Gonzalez, SS
 Juan Guzman, P

Season standings

Record vs. opponents

Transactions
 May 13, 1994: Dave Righetti signed as a free agent with the Toronto Blue Jays.
June 9, 1994: Greg Cadaret was released by the Toronto Blue Jays.

Roster

Game log

|- align="center" bgcolor="bbffbb"
| 1 || April 4 || White Sox || 7 – 3 || Guzman (1-0) || McDowell (0-1) || || 50,484 || 1-0
|- align="center" bgcolor="bbffbb"
| 2 || April 5 || White Sox || 5 – 3 || Stewart (1-0) || Fernandez (0-1) || Stottlemyre (1) || 44,471 || 2-0
|- align="center" bgcolor="ffbbbb"
| 3 || April 6 || White Sox || 9 – 2 || Álvarez (1-0) || Hentgen (0-1) || || 44,164 || 2-1
|- align="center" bgcolor="bbffbb"
| 4 || April 8 || Mariners || 8 – 2 || Leiter (1-0) || Fleming (0-1) || || 48,152 || 3-1
|- align="center" bgcolor="bbffbb"
| 5 || April 9 || Mariners || 8 – 6 || Castillo (1-0) || Thigpen (0-1) || || 49,179 || 4-1
|- align="center" bgcolor="bbffbb"
| 6 || April 10 || Mariners || 12 – 6 || Stewart (2-0) || Johnson (0-1) || || 50,471 || 5-1
|- align="center" bgcolor="bbffbb"
| 7 || April 11 || @ Athletics || 14 – 5 || Hentgen (1-1) || Witt (0-1) || || 40,551 || 6-1
|- align="center" bgcolor="ffbbbb"
| 8 || April 12 || @ Athletics || 8 – 4 || Darling (1-1) || Spoljaric (0-1) || || 24,970 || 6-2
|- align="center" bgcolor="ffbbbb"
| 9 || April 13 || @ Athletics || 8 – 7 (12) || Ontiveros (1-1) || Cadaret (0-1)  || || 12,397 || 6-3
|- align="center" bgcolor="ffbbbb"
| 10 || April 14 || @ Angels || 6 – 4 || Leiter (1-0) || Guzman (1-1) || Grahe (4) || 21,243 || 6-4
|- align="center" bgcolor="ffbbbb"
| 11 || April 15 || @ Angels || 14 – 13 (10) || Lefferts (1-0) || Brow (0-1)  || || 20,413 || 6-5
|- align="center" bgcolor="bbffbb"
| 12 || April 16 || @ Angels || 5 – 4 || Hentgen (2-1) || Patterson (0-1) || || 29,757 || 7-5
|- align="center" bgcolor="bbffbb"
| 13 || April 17 || @ Angels || 5 – 4 (10) || Stottlemyre (1-0) || Grahe (0-2)  || || 35,518 || 8-5
|- align="center" bgcolor="bbffbb"
| 14 || April 19 || Rangers || 13 – 3 || Guzman (2-1) || Brown (0-4) || || 48,149 || 9-5
|- align="center" bgcolor="bbffbb"
| 15 || April 20 || Rangers || 4 – 3 (11) || Stottlemyre (2-0) || Henke (1-1) || || 47,116 || 10-5
|- align="center" bgcolor="bbffbb"
| 16 || April 22 || Twins || 8 – 2 || Hentgen (3-1) || Erickson (1-3) || || 46,268 || 11-5
|- align="center" bgcolor="bbffbb"
| 17 || April 23 || Twins || 8 – 6 || Leiter (2-0) || Pulido (0-2) || Timlin (1) || 50,504 || 12-5
|- align="center" bgcolor="ffbbbb"
| 18 || April 24 || Twins || 7 – 3 || Tapani (1-1) || Guzman (2-2) || || 50,464 || 12-6
|- align="center" bgcolor="ffbbbb"
| 19 || April 25 || @ Royals || 4 – 3 || Cone (3-1) || Stewart (2-1) || Montgomery (1) || 17,100 || 12-7
|- align="center" bgcolor="bbffbb"
| 20 || April 26 || @ Royals || 8 – 6 || Stottlemyre (3-0) || Haney (1-1) || Timlin (2) || 16,571 || 13-7
|- align="center" bgcolor="ffbbbb"
| 21 || April 27 || @ Rangers || 11 – 3 || Rogers (2-2) || Hentgen (3-2) || || 38,055 || 13-8
|- align="center" bgcolor="ffbbbb"
| 22 || April 28 || @ Rangers || 1 – 0 || Brown (1-4) || Leiter (2-1) || Henke (3) || 27,287 || 13-9
|- align="center" bgcolor="bbffbb"
| 23 || April 29 || @ Twins || 12 – 7 || Guzman (3-2) || Tapani (1-2) || || 25,898 || 14-9
|- align="center" bgcolor="ffbbbb"
| 24 || April 30 || @ Twins || 11 – 9 || Deshaies (2-2) || Stewart (2-2) || Aguilera (6) || 24,479 || 14-10
|-

|- align="center" bgcolor="ffbbbb"
| 25 || May 1 || @ Twins || 7 – 3 || Willis (1-1) || Williams (0-1) || || 26,669 || 14-11
|- align="center" bgcolor="bbffbb"
| 26 || May 3 || Royals || 1 – 0 || Hentgen (4-2) || Appier (2-3) || || 48,173 || 15-11
|- align="center" bgcolor="ffbbbb"
| 27 || May 4 || Royals || 6 – 4 (10)|| Brewer (2-0) || Hall (0-1) || Montgomery (2) || 47,244 || 15-12
|- align="center" bgcolor="ffbbbb"
| 28 || May 5 || Royals || 11 – 9 || Gordon (2-1) || Guzman (3-3) || Montgomery (3) || 50,076 || 15-13
|- align="center" bgcolor="ffbbbb"
| 29 || May 6 || Brewers || 7 – 1 || Eldred (3-3) || Stewart (2-3) || || 47,150 || 15-14
|- align="center" bgcolor="bbffbb"
| 30 || May 7 || Brewers || 3 – 2 || Castillo (2-0) || Bronkey (1-1) || || 50,458 || 16-14
|- align="center" bgcolor="bbffbb"
| 31 || May 8 || Brewers || 3 – 1 || Hentgen (5-2) || Higuera (1-3) || Hall (1) || 48,252 || 17-14
|- align="center" bgcolor="ffbbbb"
| 32 || May 9 || @ Orioles || 4 – 1 || Fernandez (2-0) || Leiter (2-2) || Smith (14) || 47,369 || 17-15
|- align="center" bgcolor="ffbbbb"
| 33 || May 10 || @ Orioles || 6 – 3 || Oquist (1-0) || Guzman (3-4) || Smith (15) || 47,194 || 17-16
|- align="center" bgcolor="ffbbbb"
| 34 || May 11 || @ Orioles || 4 – 1 || Mussina (6-1) || Stottlemyre (3-1) || || 47,386 || 17-17
|- align="center" bgcolor="ffbbbb"
| 35 || May 13 || @ Red Sox || 5 – 3 || Hesketh (2-1) || Hentgen (5-3) || Ryan (3) || 32,579 || 17-18
|- align="center" bgcolor="ffbbbb"
| 36 || May 14 || @ Red Sox || 11 – 2 || Darwin (6-2) || Leiter (2-3) || || 33,771 || 17-19
|- align="center" bgcolor="bbbbbb"
| -- || May 15 || @ Red Sox || colspan=6|Postponed (rain) Rescheduled for August 1
|- align="center" bgcolor="bbffbb"
| 37 || May 16 || Tigers || 7 – 2 || Guzman (4-4) || Moore (3-3) || || 50,456 || 18-19
|- align="center" bgcolor="ffbbbb"
| 38 || May 17 || Tigers || 13 – 6 || Belcher (1-7) || Stottlemyre (3-2) || || 46,439 || 18-20
|- align="center" bgcolor="bbffbb"
| 39 || May 18 || Tigers || 9 – 3 || Stewart (3-3) || Gullickson (2-3) || || 47,247 || 19-20
|- align="center" bgcolor="bbffbb"
| 40 || May 20 || Indians || 2 – 0 || Hentgen (6-3) || Nagy (3-3) || || 50,501 || 20-20
|- align="center" bgcolor="bbffbb"
| 41 || May 21 || Indians || 9 – 7 || Leiter (3-3) || Nabholz (0-1) || Brow (1) || 50,519 || 21-20
|- align="center" bgcolor="ffbbbb"
| 42 || May 22 || Indians || 8 – 0 || Martínez (3-4) || Guzman (4-5) || || 48,154 || 21-21
|- align="center" bgcolor="bbffbb"
| 43 || May 23 || Indians || 6 – 5 || Hall (1-1) || Mesa (3-2) || || 48,080 || 22-21
|- align="center" bgcolor="ffbbbb"
| 44 || May 24 || @ Yankees || 6 – 1 || Mulholland (5-3) || Stewart (3-4) || || 26,217 || 22-22
|- align="center" bgcolor="ffbbbb"
| 45 || May 25 || @ Yankees || 5 – 2 || Abbott (6-2) || Hentgen (6-4) || || 23,250 || 22-23
|- align="center" bgcolor="ffbbbb"
| 46 || May 27 || Angels || 6 – 2 || Leftwich (3-4) || Leiter (3-4) || || 48,244 || 22-24
|- align="center" bgcolor="bbffbb"
| 47 || May 28 || Angels || 9 – 4 || Guzman (5-5) || Langston (2-3) || || 50,509 || 23-24
|- align="center" bgcolor="bbffbb"
| 48 || May 29 || Angels || 5 – 0 || Stottlemyre (4-2) || Finley (4-4) || || 50,529 || 24-24
|- align="center" bgcolor="ffbbbb"
| 49 || May 30 || Athletics || 6 – 2 || Acre (1-0) || Brow  (0-2) || || 50,088 || 24-25
|- align="center" bgcolor="ffbbbb"
| 50 || May 31 || Athletics || 7 – 2 || Darling (4-6) || Hentgen (6-5) || Eckersley (5) || 50,211 || 24-26
|-

|- align="center" bgcolor="ffbbbb"
| 51 || June 1 || Athletics || 9 – 5 || Welch (1-5) || Castillo (2-1) || || 50,471 || 24-27
|- align="center" bgcolor="bbffbb"
| 52 || June 3 || @ Mariners || 9 – 6 || Guzman (6-5) || Salkeld (2-3) || Hall (2) || 23,310 || 25-27
|- align="center" bgcolor="ffbbbb"
| 53 || June 4 || @ Mariners || 2 – 0 || Johnson (7-3) || Stottlemyre (4-3) || || 37,127 || 25-28
|- align="center" bgcolor="bbffbb"
| 54 || June 5 || @ Mariners || 5 – 4 || Stewart (4-4) || Fleming (3-8) || Hall (3) || 26,339 || 26-28
|- align="center" bgcolor="bbffbb"
| 55 || June 7 || @ White Sox || 9 – 5 || Hentgen (7-5) || Álvarez (8-1) || Hall (4) || 37,184 || 27-28
|- align="center" bgcolor="ffbbbb"
| 56 || June 8 || @ White Sox || 3 – 2 || Johnson (1-0) || Hall (1-2) || || 29,920 || 27-29
|- align="center" bgcolor="bbffbb"
| 57 || June 9 || Yankees || 7 – 5 || Williams (1-1) || Mulholland (5-6) || Brow (2) || 50,521 || 28-29
|- align="center" bgcolor="bbffbb"
| 58 || June 10 || Yankees || 7 – 2 || Stottlemyre (5-3) || Abbott (6-5) || || 50,522 || 29-29
|- align="center" bgcolor="ffbbbb"
| 59 || June 11 || Yankees || 9 – 2 || Key (9-1) || Stewart (4-5) || Wickman (3) || 50,530 || 29-30
|- align="center" bgcolor="bbffbb"
| 60 || June 12 || Yankees || 3 – 1 || Hentgen (8-5) || Kamieniecki (4-2) || Castillo (1) || 50,511 || 30-30
|- align="center" bgcolor="ffbbbb"
| 61 || June 13 || @ Indians || 7 – 3 || Clark (8-1) || Cornett (0-1) || || 41,598 || 30-31
|- align="center" bgcolor="ffbbbb"
| 62 || June 14 || @ Indians || 7 – 5 || Mesa (6-3) || Guzman (6-6) || Shuey (4) || 41,887 || 30-32
|- align="center" bgcolor="ffbbbb"
| 63 || June 15 || @ Indians || 4 – 3 (13)|| Mesa (7-3) || Brow  (0-3) || || 41,794 || 30-33
|- align="center" bgcolor="bbffbb"
| 64 || June 17 || @ Tigers || 7 – 4 || Stewart (5-5) || Gardiner (2-1) || Hall (5) || 36,210 || 31-33
|- align="center" bgcolor="ffbbbb"
| 65 || June 18 || @ Tigers || 6 – 5 (11)|| Boever (5-0) || Williams (1-2) || || 37,534 || 31-34
|- align="center" bgcolor="ffbbbb"
| 66 || June 19 || @ Tigers || 3 – 1 || Gohr (2-0) || Guzman (6-7) || Gardiner (4) || 35,772 || 31-35
|- align="center" bgcolor="ffbbbb"
| 67 || June 20 || Red Sox || 4 – 1 || Hesketh (4-4) || Stottlemyre (5-4) || Fossas (1) || 50,028 || 31-36
|- align="center" bgcolor="ffbbbb"
| 68 || June 21 || Red Sox || 13 – 1 || Sele (6-3) || Cornett (0-2) || || 49,460 || 31-37
|- align="center" bgcolor="ffbbbb"
| 69 || June 22 || Red Sox || 3 – 2 || Minchey (1-2) || Stewart (5-6) || Ryan (4) || 50,288 || 31-38
|- align="center" bgcolor="ffbbbb"
| 70 || June 24 || Orioles || 5 – 1 || Eichhorn (3-1) || Righetti (0-1) || || 50,508 || 31-39
|- align="center" bgcolor="ffbbbb"
| 71 || June 25 || Orioles || 4 – 1 || Eichhorn (4-1) || Guzman (6-8) || Smith (25) || 50,526 || 31-40
|- align="center" bgcolor="ffbbbb"
| 72 || June 26 || Orioles || 7 – 1 || Mussina (11-4) || Stottlemyre (5-5) || || 50,229 || 31-41
|- align="center" bgcolor="ffbbbb"
| 73 || June 27 || @ Brewers || 5 – 1 || Eldred (9-7) || Leiter (3-5) || || 15,746 || 31-42
|- align="center" bgcolor="ffbbbb"
| 74 || June 28 || @ Brewers || 6 – 4 || Mercedes (1-0) || Stewart (5-7) || Fetters (8) || 18,905 || 31-43
|- align="center" bgcolor="bbffbb"
| 75 || June 29 || @ Brewers || 5 – 0 || Hentgen (9-5) || Bones (7-5) || || 20,576 || 32-43
|- align="center" bgcolor="ffbbbb"
| 76 || June 30 || @ Brewers || 9 – 2 || Wegman (6-0) || Guzman (6-9) || || 27,231 || 32-44
|-

|- align="center" bgcolor="ffbbbb"
| 77 || July 1 || @ Royals || 4 – 3 (12)|| Montgomery (2-3) || Williams (1-3) || || 21,496 || 32-45
|- align="center" bgcolor="bbffbb"
| 78 || July 2 || @ Royals || 7 – 6 || Castillo (3-1) || Meacham (0-1) || Hall (6) || 27,800 || 33-45
|- align="center" bgcolor="ffbbbb"
| 79 || July 3 || @ Royals || 11 – 6 || Cone (12-4) || Stewart (5-8) || || 25,421 || 33-46
|- align="center" bgcolor="bbffbb"
| 80 || July 4 || @ Royals || 9 – 4 || Hentgen (10-5) || Milacki (0-3) || || 38,039 || 34-46
|- align="center" bgcolor="bbffbb"
| 81 || July 5 || @ Twins || 14 – 3 || Guzman (7-9) || Mahomes (7-4) || || 22,380 || 35-46
|- align="center" bgcolor="ffbbbb"
| 82 || July 6 || @ Twins || 5 – 4 || Erickson (8-6) || Stottlemyre (5-6) || Aguilera (18) || 26,479 || 35-47
|- align="center" bgcolor="bbffbb"
| 83 || July 7 || @ Twins || 4 – 3 || Castillo (4-1) || Willis (1-3) || Hall (7) || 31,180 || 36-47
|- align="center" bgcolor="ffbbbb"
| 84 || July 8 || Royals || 6 – 5 || Pichardo (3-2) || Hall (1-3) || Montgomery (14) || 50,515 || 36-48
|- align="center" bgcolor="bbffbb"
| 85 || July 9 || Royals || 9 – 4 || Hentgen (11-5) || Milacki (0-4) || || 50,524 || 37-48
|- align="center" bgcolor="bbffbb"
| 86 || July 10 || Royals || 7 – 3 || Guzman (8-9) || Gubicza (5-8) || Cox (1) || 50,504 || 38-48
|- align="center" bgcolor="ffbbbb"
| 87 || July 14 || @ Rangers || 7 – 3 || Fajardo (5-5) || Stottlemyre (5-7) || || 42,621 || 38-49
|- align="center" bgcolor="bbffbb"
| 88 || July 15 || @ Rangers || 7 – 5 || Guzman (9-9) || Dettmer (0-4) || Hall (8) || 46,511 || 39-49
|- align="center" bgcolor="ffbbbb"
| 89 || July 16 || @ Rangers || 4 – 2 || Brown (7-8) || Hentgen (11-6) || Henke (10) || 46,510 || 39-50
|- align="center" bgcolor="bbffbb"
| 90 || July 17 || @ Rangers || 3 – 1 || Stewart (6-8) || Rogers (10-5) || Hall (9) || 46,394 || 40-50
|- align="center" bgcolor="bbffbb"
| 91 || July 18 || Twins || 7 – 4 || Leiter (4-5) || Guardado (0-2) || Hall (10) || 48,060 || 41-50
|- align="center" bgcolor="bbffbb"
| 92 || July 19 || Twins || 4 – 2 || Castillo (5-1) || Tapani (9-6) || Hall (11) || 47,222 || 42-50
|- align="center" bgcolor="bbffbb"
| 93 || July 20 || Twins || 9 – 2 || Guzman (10-9) || Erickson (8-9) || || 48,162 || 43-50
|- align="center" bgcolor="bbffbb"
| 94 || July 21 || Rangers || 9 – 3 || Hentgen (12-6) || Leary (1-1) || Cox (2) || 49,618 || 44-50
|- align="center" bgcolor="bbffbb"
| 95 || July 22 || Rangers || 3 – 2 || Stewart (7-8) || Rogers (10-6) || Hall (12) || 50,522 || 45-50
|- align="center" bgcolor="bbffbb"
| 96 || July 23 || Rangers || 9 – 1 || Leiter (5-5) || Fajardo (5-7) || || 50,529 || 46-50
|- align="center" bgcolor="bbffbb"
| 97 || July 24 || Rangers || 4 – 2 || Cornett (1-2) || Pavlik (1-5) || Cox (3) || 50,521 || 47-50
|- align="center" bgcolor="ffbbbb"
| 98 || July 26 || Brewers || 7 – 5 || Bones (10-7) || Guzman (10-10) || Fetters (13) || 49,098 || 47-51
|- align="center" bgcolor="ffbbbb"
| 99 || July 27 || Brewers || 5 – 0 || Wegman (8-3) || Hentgen (12-7) || || 47,172 || 47-52
|- align="center" bgcolor="ffbbbb"
| 100 || July 28 || Brewers || 5 – 4 || Orosco (2-1) || Cox (0-1) || Fetters (14) || 47,061 || 47-53
|- align="center" bgcolor="bbffbb"
| 101 || July 29 || @ Orioles || 4 – 3 || Leiter (6-5) || Moyer (4-7) || Hall (13) || 47,497 || 48-53
|- align="center" bgcolor="ffbbbb"
| 102 || July 30 || @ Orioles || 7 – 5 || Eichhorn (6-4) || Timlin (0-1) || Smith (32) || 47,000 || 48-54
|- align="center" bgcolor="bbffbb"
| 103 || July 31 || @ Orioles || 6 – 4 || Guzman (11-10) || McDonald (12-7) || Hall (14) || 47,684 || 49-54
|-

|- align="center" bgcolor="bbffbb"
| 104 || August 1 || @ Red Sox || 6 – 2 || Hentgen (13-7) || Sele (7-7) || || || 50-54
|- align="center" bgcolor="ffbbbb"
| 105 || August 1 || @ Red Sox || 4 – 3 || Minchey (2-3) || Cornett (1-3) || Ryan (12) || 33,429 || 50-55
|- align="center" bgcolor="bbffbb"
| 106 || August 2 || @ Red Sox || 8 – 7 || Cox (1-1) || Bankhead (3-1) || Hall (15) || 32,976 || 51-55
|- align="center" bgcolor="ffbbbb"
| 107 || August 3 || @ Red Sox || 7 – 2 || Van Egmond (2-3) || Leiter (6-6) || || 32,047 || 51-56
|- align="center" bgcolor="bbffbb"
| 108 || August 4 || @ Red Sox || 5 – 2 || Stottlemyre (6-7) || Clemens (9-7) || Hall (16) || 33,199 || 52-56
|- align="center" bgcolor="bbffbb"
| 109 || August 5 || Tigers || 4 – 2 || Guzman (12-10) || Wells (4-7) || Hall (17) || 50,522 || 53-56
|- align="center" bgcolor="ffbbbb"
| 110 || August 6 || Tigers || 3 – 2 || Moore (11-10) || Hentgen (13-8) || Boever (3) || 50,512 || 53-57
|- align="center" bgcolor="ffbbbb"
| 111 || August 7 || Tigers || 8 – 7 || Davis (2-3) || Castillo (5-2) || Cadaret (2) || 50,509 || 53-58
|- align="center" bgcolor="ffbbbb"
| 112 || August 8 || Indians || 6 – 1 || Nagy (10-8) || Leiter (6-7) || || 50,515 || 53-59
|- align="center" bgcolor="bbffbb"
| 113 || August 9 || Indians || 12 – 5 || Stottlemyre (7-7) || Lopez (1-2) || || 50,527 || 54-59
|- align="center" bgcolor="ffbbbb"
| 114 || August 10 || Indians || 5 – 3 || Grimsley (5-2) || Guzman (12-11) || Plunk (3) || 50,510 || 54-60
|- align="center" bgcolor="bbffbb"
| 115 || August 11 || @ Yankees || 8 – 7 (13)|| Hall (2-3) || Ausanio (2-1) || || 37,333 || 55-60
|-

| *An MLB Players strike forced the cancellation of the remainder of the season on August 12.

Player stats

Batting

Starters by position
Note: Pos = Position; G = Games played; AB = At bats; H = Hits; Avg. = Batting average; HR = Home runs; RBI = Runs batted in

Other batters
Note: G = Games played; AB = At bats; H = Hits; Avg. = Batting average; HR = Home runs; RBI = Runs batted in

Pitching

Starting pitchers
Note: G = Games pitched; IP = Innings pitched; W = Wins; L = Losses; ERA = Earned run average; SO = Strikeouts

Other pitchers
Note: G = Games pitched; IP = Innings pitched; W = Wins; L = Losses; ERA = Earned run average; SO = Strikeouts

Relief pitchers
Note: G = Games pitched; W = Wins; L = Losses; SV = Saves; ERA = Earned run average; SO = Strikeouts

Awards and honors
Joe Carter, Player of the Month Award, April
Devon White, Gold Glove Award
Roberto Alomar, Gold Glove Award

All-Star Game
 Roberto Alomar, 2B, starter
 Joe Carter, OF, starter
 Pat Hentgen, P, reserve
 Paul Molitor, DH, reserve
 Cito Gaston, manager

Farm system

References

External links
1994 Toronto Blue Jays at Baseball Reference
1994 Toronto Blue Jays at Baseball Almanac

Toronto Blue Jays seasons
Toronto Blue Jays season
1994 in Canadian sports
1994 in Toronto